XHRYA-FM (branded as Más Music FM) is a noncommercial Spanish-language FM radio station that serves the McAllen, Texas (USA) / Reynosa, Tamaulipas (Mexico) border area.

History
XHRYA was permitted on November 22, 1988. For the first 19 years of its life, until November 15, 2007, it was operated by the Universidad México Americana del Norte and known as Stereo América. It was a cultural station with a format of primarily instrumental music, as well as news, weather and traffic reports. In 2007, XHRYA was relaunched as Más Music, with a pop/rock format similar to other stations in the region.

External links

 masmusic.tv
 raiostationworld.com; Radio stations serving the Rio Grande Valley

References

Radio stations established in 1988
Radio stations in Reynosa